Culcairn is a town in the south-east Riverina region of New South Wales, Australia. Culcairn is located in the Greater Hume Shire local government area on the Olympic Highway between Albury and Wagga Wagga.

The town is an important supply centre for nearby towns and villages including, Morven, Gerogery, Henty, Walla Walla and Pleasant Hills. Billabong Creek runs along the southern edge of town, lending its name to the local high school.

History

European settlement of Culcairn began in 1834, following favorable reports on grazing potential and grass cover by the explorers Hume and Hovell when traveling overland to the Port Phillip district in 1824. The reward for Morgan would reach £1,000. He was ambushed and killed in Victoria after his final holdup in 1865.

The town itself was laid out in 1880 by James Balfour, a local landowner, who named it after a property in the parish of Kiltearn, his mother's birthplace.  Culcairn Post Office opened on 1 September 1880.

Early industries included chaff mills, a cereal grain company and a quarry.  The extension of the Main Southern railway line to Albury to meet the broad gauge line from Melbourne saw Culcairn prosper.  The Culcairn Hotel, constructed in 1891, was the largest on the line between Melbourne and Sydney.

Heritage listings 
Culcairn has a number of heritage-listed sites, including:
 Main Southern railway: Culcairn railway station

Sports and recreation 

The Culcairn Football Club is an Australian rules football club that was first established in May, 1895.

In 1916, a 21 year old former player, Private Dan Dalahunty was killed in action, was one of the "Men of the Dardanelles".

In 1923, Culcairn's jumper colours were - maroon with blue cuffs and collars; maroon socks, topped with blue.

Culcairn played Mangoplah in the 1923 Grand Final at Yerong Creek and Mangoplah won the Yerong Creek & DFA premiership. 

Culcairn has played in the following football competitions - 

1910 - 1913: Culcairn & District Football Association. Premiers - 1910. Captain - E J Wilson. 
1914 - 1915: Culcairn & District Junior Football Association
1916 - 1918: In recess due to World War I
1919 - 1921: Culcairn & District Football Association. Premiers - 1921.  
1922 - Riverina Main Line Football Association. Runners Up - 1922.
1923 - Yerong Creek & District Football Association. Runners Up - 1923.
1924 - 1929: Riverina Football Association. Runners Up - 1928.
1930 - 1940: Albury & District Football League. Premiers - 1936 Runners Up - 1938, 1940
1941 - 1945: In recess due to World War II
1946 - 1956: Albury & District Football League. Premiers - 1952, 1953, 1954. Runners Up - 1946, 1951.
1957 - 1980: Farrer Football League. Premiers - 1963, 1968. Runners Up - 
1981 - 1991: Tallangatta & District Football League. Premiers - 1990.
1992 - 2022: Hume Football League. Premiers - 1993, 2007. Runners Up - 1992, 1994, 2005.

Culcairn & District Football Association
This Australian Rules Football competition was formed in 1910 and ran for four years up until 1913, then went into recess due to World War One. Depending on what side of the railway line the club was situated in, the competition had a Western Division and an Eastern Division. The competition re-formed in 1919.

Culcairn & DFA - Grand Finals
 1910 - Culcairn: 43 defeated Walbundrie: 35. Played at Culcairn. 
1911 - Walbundrie: 6.12 - 48 defeated Germanton: 2.7 - 19. Played at Culcairn.
1912 - Germanton: 6.11 - 47 defeated Walla Walla: 2.7 - 19. Played at Culcairn. Scholtz Cup.
1913 - Germanton: 7.3 - 45 defeated Culcairn: 4.7 - 31. Played at Culcairn.
1914 - 1918: Culcairn & DFA in recess due to WW1.
1919 - Holbrook: 10.13 - 73 defeated Culcairn: 4.10 - 34. Played at Culcairn.
1920 - Holbrook d Henty
1921 - Culcairn defeated Holbrook. Played at Culcairn.

 Germanton. This town was renamed as Holbrook in 1915.

In 1922, the Riverina Main Line Football Association that was formed and based in Wagga Wagga. The seven club's that made up this competition were - Culcairn, Henty, Mangoplah, Wagga Federals, Wagga Newtown, Wagga Stars and Yerong Creek. This competition was only in existence for one season, with the Wagga Stars defeating Yerong Creek in the Grand Final. On the eve of the final series Culcairn, Henty, and Mangoplah withdrew from the competition, citing the fact the association refused to provide a VFL umpire for the final series.

Teams in the Culcairn & DFA per year
1910: Eastern Division - Cookardinia, Culcairn, Germanton and Henty. Western Division - Balldale, Brocklesby, Walbundrie and Walla Walla.
1911: Eastern Division - Cookardinia, Culcairn, Germanton and Henty. Western Division - Balldale, Brocklesby, Walbundrie and Walla Walla.
1912: Eastern Division - Cookardinia, Culcairn, Germanton, Henty and Morven. Western Division - Balldale, Brocklesby, Walbundrie and Walla Walla.

Notable residents 
 Rugby league player Bradley Clyde was born and raised in Culcairn.
 Triple Olympic equestrian Gold medallist Andrew Hoy was born and raised in Culcairn.

Transport
Culcairn sits on the main railway line between Sydney and Melbourne and is serviced by the NSW TrainLink XPT service which runs twice daily and stops at the local railway station. The station was once the junction for the Corowa and Holbrook branch lines.

References

External links 

 Greater Hume Shire Council - Greater Hume Shire Website
 Culcairn Railway Station

Towns in the Riverina
Towns in New South Wales
Greater Hume Shire